The International Islamic Council for Da'wah and Relief (IICDR and variously Dawa'a, Dawaa, Dawah or Da’wa) (Arabic: المجلس الإسلامي العالمي للدعوة والإغاثة), headquartered in Cairo, Egypt, consists of 86 Islamic organizations. Its stated purpose is to promote the message of Islam, improve relations between Islamic peoples, and provide aid and assistance for the needy, orphans, and widows.

IICDR includes more than one hundred Islamic NGOs and GOs all over the world. The Presidency Staff Council consists of  Sheikh Al Azhar (president),  Marshal AbdelRahman Sowar Al Dahap (vice-president),  Al Sheikh Yousf Al Hegy (vice-president),  Abdulah Salih Al Obeid (vice-president), Dr Abdullah bin Abdulaziz Al-Musleh (secretary-general), and Presidents of Specialized Committees in the council Abdullah Omar Nasseef (IICI) Abdulmalik Al Hamar (IICHR) S. Abdien (IICW&CH), and Hamid Bin Ahmad Al-Rifaie (president of IIFD).

Stated goals include guiding Islamic work and activities; organizing the efforts of the Islamic Umma (Muslim Nation) to be in service of Islamic issues; and activating divine values to achieve human dignity, security, and justice on Earth.

Controversy

Spreading of radical ideas 

On 23 November, 2017, the International Islamic Council was designated as a terrorist Organization and was added to the Anti-Terrorism Quartet Watchlist for Anti Terrorism by Saudi Arabia, Bahrain, Egypt, and UAE.
This followed the 2017 Qatar diplomatic crisis and Qatar's affiliation with supporting the Muslim brotherhood and facilitating the spreading of radical views and extremist agendas and propaganda throughout the Arab world.

Members and office holders
The Secretary-General is Dr Abdullah bin Abdulaziz Al-Musleh.

Member organizations:

 International Islamic Forum for Dialogue (IIFD)
 Abibakr As-Sidiq Philanthropic Home - Nigeria
 Al-Azhar al-Shareef - Cairo
 Muslim World League - Mecca
 World Muslim Congress  - Pakistan
 Direct Aid - Kuwait

 Common Islamic Conference of Al-Quds (Jerusalem, Jordan)
 World Assembly of Muslim Youth - Riyadh
 Human Relief Foundation - United Kingdom
 International Humanitarian and Charity Organisation - United Arab Emirates
 Islamic Abo Al-Nor Complex - Damascus
 Ministry of Al Aogaf and Islamic Affairs - Egypt
 Ministry of Al Aogaf & Islamic Affairs - Morocco
 Indonesian Supreme Council for Islamic Daw'ah - Jakarta
 Islamic Wagaf Foundation for Education & Guidance - Nigeria
 Kuwait Zakat House - Kuwait
 Islamic Solidarity Fund of the Organisation of Islamic Cooperation - Saudi Arabia
 Islamic Union of the Student Organization - Turkey
 Jordanian Hashemic Foundation for Charity
 Islamic Union of North America - USA
 Dar Al Fatwah - Lebanon
 World Islamic Council - London
 Union of the Islamic Organization - France
 Ministry of Islamic Affairs & aL Aogaf - UAE
 Ministry of Islamic Affairs & aL Aogaf - Qatar
 Organization of Islamic Daw'a - Sudan
 Ministry of Islamic Affairs & Al Aogaf - Kuwait
 Open American University - USA
 Union of the Islamic Organization - Europe
 International Islamic Committee for Woman and Child (IICWC)
 International Islamic Relief Organization
 World Assembly of Muslim Youth

External links

References

Islamic relief organizations